Cloelia was a legendary woman from the early history of ancient Rome.

Biography
She was one of the women taken hostage by Lars Porsena, as a part of the peace treaty which ended the war between Rome and Clusium in 508 BC. There are two different stories explaining her escape and it is unclear which one is true as both are accepted by different scholars and historians. The first version of Cloelia's escape recognizes that the female hostages went to the river to bathe. Once having persuaded their guards to leave them alone at the river, in order to remain modest, they swam across the river into Roman territory. Once in Roman territory the female hostages were then safe from their captures. The second version of Cloelia's escapes claims that she escaped from the Etruscan camp, leading away a group of Roman virgins. According to Valerius Maximus, she fled upon a horse, and swam across the river Tiber through a barrage of hostile darts thus bringing her band of girls to safety.

When Porsena learnt of their escape, he quickly sent emissaries to Rome demanding her return. However, Porsena soon reconsidered deciding that her deeds were worthy of admiration, equal to that of Cocles and Mucius. He declared to the Romans that if she were restored to him he would send her back to Rome safe and inviolate, but if his demands were not met he should regard the treaty as broken.

The Romans agreed to the conditions and returned the pledge of peace, as the treaty required. Porsena praised Cloelia on her arrival and as a reward for her heroism, promised to release half the share of his hostages of her choice. It is said that she selected the young boys, as was unanimously decided by the hostages, since they were particularly at risk of abuse. 

Once peace had been established The Romans celebrated her valour by building a statue of a maiden seated in a horse, set up on the summit of the Via Sacra.

Cultural depictions

Cloelia has been depicted in several paintings and in the libretto Il trionfo di Clelia (1762) by Pietro Metastasio.
She was also portrayed by Sylvia Syms in the 1961 Italian movie Le Vergini di Roma.

See also
Cloelia gens
Gaius Mucius Scaevola
Horatius Cocles

References

Sources
Livy, Ab urbe condita, 2.13
Valerius Maximus, Factorum ac dictorum memorabilium, 3.2.2

External links
 

6th-century BC Roman women
Ancient Roman women in warfare
Cloelii